Self-sustainability and self-sufficiency are overlapping states of being in which a person or an organization needs little or no help from, or interaction with, others. Self-sufficiency entails the self being enough (to fulfill needs), and a self-sustaining entity can maintain self-sufficiency indefinitely. These states represent types of personal or collective autonomy. A self-sufficient economy is one that requires little or no trade with the outside world and is called an autarky.

Description

Self-sustainability is a type of sustainable living in which nothing is consumed other than what is produced by the self-sufficient individuals. Examples of attempts at self-sufficiency in North America include simple living, food storage, homesteading, off-the-grid, survivalism, DIY ethic,  and the back-to-the-land movement.

Practices that enable or aid self-sustainability include autonomous building, permaculture, sustainable agriculture, and renewable energy. The term is also applied to limited forms of self-sustainability, for example growing one's own food or becoming economically independent of state subsidies. The self-sustainability of an electrical installation measures its degree of grid independence and is defined as the ratio between the amount of locally produced energy that is locally consumed, either directly or after storage, and the total consumption.

A system is self-sustaining (or self-sufficient) if it can  maintain itself by independent effort. The system self-sustainability is:

 the degree at which the system can sustain itself without external support
 the fraction of time in which the system is  self-sustaining

Self-sustainability is considered one of the "ilities" and is closely related to sustainability and availability.  In the economics literature, a system that has the quality of being self-sustaining is also referred to as an autarky.

Examples

Political states

Autarky exists whenever an entity can survive or continue its activities without external assistance. Autarky is not necessarily economic. For example, a military autarky would be a state that could defend itself without help from another country.

Labor

According to the Idaho Department of Labor, an employed adult shall be considered self-sufficient if the family income exceeds 200% of the Office of Management and Budget poverty income level guidelines.

Peer-to-peer swarming

In peer-to-peer swarming systems, a swarm is self-sustaining if all the  blocks  of its files are available among peers (excluding seeds and publishers).

Discussion

Self-sustainability and survivability

Whereas self-sustainability is a quality of one’s independence,  survivability applies to the future maintainability of one’s self-sustainability and indeed one’s existence. Many believe that more self-sustainability guarantees a higher degree of survivability. However, just as many oppose this, arguing that it isn't self-sustainability that is essential for survivability, but on the contrary specialization and thus dependence.

Consider the first two  examples presented above.  Among countries, commercial treats are as important as self-sustainability. An autarky is usually inefficient. Among people, social ties have been shown to be correlated to happiness and success as much as self-sustainability.

See also
 Autarky
 Availability
 Back-to-the-land movement
 Cottagecore
 Eating your own dog food
 Five Acres and Independence
 Food sovereignty
 Homesteading
 Independence
 Individualism
 Juche
 List of system quality attributes
 Localism 
 Rugged individualism
 Self-help
 Survivalism
 Tiny house movement
 Vegetable farming

Notes and references

External links

Foundation for Self-Sufficiency in Central America
Development Initiatives Strategies for Self-Sustainability

 
Applied probability